Galapagos NV (formerly known as Galapagos Genomics) is a Belgian pharmaceutical research company which was founded in 1999. Its headquarters are located in Mechelen and has additional locations in Leiden, Romainville, Basel, Milan, Madrid, Boston and Zagreb. The outgoing CEO is the Dutchman Onno van de Stolpe and his replacement is Paul Stoffels,  effective April 1, 2022.  

The company develops drugs against rheumatoid arthritis, Crohn's disease, ulcerative colitis, psoriasis, systemic lupus erythematosus and cystic fibrosis.

History

Galapagos Genomics NV was founded in 1999 as a joint venture between Crucell and Tibotec. The company later changed its name to Galapagos NV and completed its initial public offering on Euronext Amsterdam and Euronext Brussels in May 2005.

The company uses a technological platform for its research, which is based on adenoviruses to introduce human gene sequences into a wide variety of human cell lines to knock-in or knock-down specific proteins.

In 2019, Gilead Sciences and Galapagos entered into transformative research and development collaboration. Gilead and Galapagos have also agreed to amend certain terms around the development and commercialization of filgotinib.

In June 2022, the business announced it would acquire CellPoint for €125 million, with milestones of up to €100 million and AboundBio for $14million.

Drugs currently under development
Filgotinib (GLPG0634) a selective inhibitor of JAK1 (Janus kinase 1) being developed for the treatment of rheumatoid arthritis and potentially Crohn's disease.
GLPG1205: a first-in-class GPR84-inhibitor currently under research for the treatment of inflammatory bowel disease.

See also
 FlandersBio

References

External links
 

Belgian brands
Pharmaceutical companies of Belgium
Pharmaceutical companies established in 1999
Companies listed on Euronext Brussels
Companies based in Antwerp Province
1999 establishments in Belgium